The 2005 Women's Hockey Champions Challenge was the third edition of the field hockey championship for women. It was held in Virginia Beach, United States from July 8–16, 2005.

New Zealand participate in 2006 Champions Trophy in Amstelveen, Netherlands after defeated South Africa in the final.

Squads

Head Coach: Danny Kerry

Head Coach: John Sheahan

Head Coach: Pablo Usoz

Head Coach: Ian Rutledge

Head Coach: Jenny King

Head Coach: Lee Bodimeade

Umpires

Results
All times are Eastern Standard Time (UTC−04:00)

Group stage

Fixtures

Classification matches

Fifth and sixth place

Third and fourth place

Final

Awards
The following awards were presented at the conclusion of the tournament:

Statistics

Final standings

Goalscorers

References

External links
Official FIH website
Official website
Official website

2005
2005 in women's field hockey
2005 in American women's sports
2005 Women's Hockey Champions Challenge
2005 in sports in Virginia
Sports in Virginia Beach, Virginia
July 2005 sports events in the United States